The Société d’Economie Politique is a French learned society concerned with political economy. It was founded in 1842 to provide a forum for discussion of free trade, a subject of violent debate at the time, and has continued to organize discussions on economic and social issues to the present day.

History

The Société d’Économie Politique was founded on 1 February 1842 in Paris.
It was created by the followers of Jean-Baptiste Say to provide an open forum for debate on economics at a time when there were violent arguments over free trade.
The society was led informally by Pellegrino Rossi as president and Count Ferdinand-Charles-Philippe d' Esterno  (1805–83) as secretary.
The debates were very academic in nature, and the society dissolved after a few meetings.
Members included Louis Leclerc, Jean-Pierre Clément, Hippolyte Dusard, Louis Reybaud, Louis Wolowski, Léon Faucher, Horace Émile Say (1794–1860), son of Jean-Baptiste Say, Théodore Fix, Charles Dunoyer, Michel Chevalier, Hippolyte Passy and Jérôme-Adolphe Blanqui.

Three friends, Adolphe-Gustave Blaise (1811–86), Joseph Garnier (1813–81) and Gilbert Guillaumin (1801–64) decided to form a freer and more accessible society in which the sessions would be both enjoyable and instructive.
It would meet once a month to dine and discuss political economy. 
This idea was accepted, and the first meeting of five people was held on 15 November 1842 including Blaise, Garnier, Guillaumin and Eugène Daire (1798–1847).
The numbers grew with successive meetings, including those from the Rossi-d'Esterno group and others.
The society was open to men with very different positions in life and diverse political views, most of them influential either through their position or their writings.
They could meet on neutral scientific grounds to exchange views on subjects such as the functions of the state, land rents, commercial freedom, public finances, the Crédit Foncier, regulations and socialism.
The central theme was always political economy.

Until 1845 the society had no formal leadership, but each meeting had a president, generally Pellegrino Rossi, who chaired the discussion.
In 1845 the society elected two presidents (Charles Dunoyer and Hippolyte Passy), two vice-presidents (Horace Émile Say and Charles Renouard), a secretary, who became permanent in 1849 (Joseph Garnier) and a quaestor (Gilbert Guillaumin).
In 1845 it was absorbed by the Société des économistes.
In 1847 this society changed its name to the Société d’Economie Politique.
By 1852 there were about sixty members from the legislature, administration, industry, commerce, teaching, law, letters and contributors to the Journal des Économistes.
Distinguished visitors to Paris were invited to the meetings.

Émile Mireaux was a member of the Société d'économie politique in Paris.
He served as its secretary-general from 1930 to 1937, then president from 1937 to 1940.
He belonged to the young school that helped adapt the old orthodox doctrines to the modern economy.

As of 2017 the society had almost 450 members, and included academics, business executives and senior civil servants.
It continued to provide a forum for discussion of economic and social issues.
Once a month the society organizes a dinner-debate at the Cercle de l’Union Interalliée, with a personality invited to present their views on a specific topic.
Since 1846 the society has published the Annales d’économie politique, which contains papers and debates from the past academic season.

Leaders

Presidents included:

 Charles Dunoyer, 1842–46
 Hippolyte Passy, 1842–46, 1845
 Charles Renouard, 1842–46, 1845-
 Michel Chevalier, 1842–46
 Joseph Garnier, 1842
 Léon Say, 1842
 Édouard René de Laboulaye, 1861
 Frédéric Passy, 1855–1912
 Pierre Émile Levasseur, 1895–1911
 Pierre Paul Leroy-Beaulieu, 1911–16
 Yves Guyot, 1913–28
 Raphaël-Georges Lévy, 1917–28
 Clément Colson, 1929–33
 Henri Truchy, 1932–36
 Edgard Allix, 1937-1938
 Émile Mireaux, 1938–40
 Louis Baudin, 1946–50
 Jacques Rueff, 1950–54
 Édouard Bonnefous, 1954–58
 Gaston Leduc, 1958–62
 Luc Durand-Réville 1962–66
 Daniel Villey, 1966–68
 Jean Marczewski, –1976
 Gérald Heim de Balsac, 1976–80
 Jacques Plassard, 1984–88
 Alain Bienaymé, 1988–92
 Gérard Worms, 1992–94
 Albert Merlin, 1994–96
 Philippe Chalmin, 1998–2000
 Emmanuel Rodocanachi, 2002–04
 Jean-Paul Betbeze, 2004–08
 Jacques Mistral, 2008–12
 Valérie Plagnol, 2012–16
 Denis Ferrand, from November 2016

Publications

Notes

Sources

Economics societies
Political economy
1842 establishments in France